Minimal model may refer to:
 Minimal model (physics), two-dimensional conformal field theories with finitely many primary fields

Mathematics
 Minimal model (birational geometry), classification of algebraic varieties with the goal to construct a birational model of any complex projective variety which is as simple as possible
 Minimal model (set theory), the minimal standard model of ZFC, part of the constructible universe

See also
 Sullivan minimal model, algebraic topology model of a differential graded algebra used in rational homotopy theory
 Neron minimal model, algebraic geometry model for abelian varieties over the quotient field of a Dedekind domain R with perfect residue fields
 Minimalism (disambiguation)